Rajpur is one of the six block divisions of Balrampur district, Chhattisgarh, along with Balrampur, Shankargarh, Kusmi, Ramchandarpur, and Wadrafnagar.

References

Community development blocks in Balrampur district, Chhattisgarh
Community development blocks in Chhattisgarh
Cities and towns in Balrampur district, Chhattisgarh